is a railway station on the Itō Line of the East Japan Railway Company, located in the central part of the city of Atami, Shizuoka Prefecture, Japan. The Tōkaidō Main Line runs parallel to the Itō Line through Kinomiya Station, but only Itō Line has a station at this location. The 0-km indicator of the Itō Line is located at this station, although the Itō Line “officially” starts at Atami.

Lines
Kinomiya Station is served by the Itō Line and is located 1.2 kilometers from the northern terminus of the line at Atami Station and 105.8 kilometers from Tokyo Station.

Layout
Kinomiya Station has one  island platform connected to the station building by an underground passage. The station is unattended.

Platforms

History 
The area around the Kinomiya Station is landfill, from the previous rubble formed by the digging of the Tanna Tunnel.

On April 1, 1987 along with division and privatization of the Japan National Railway, East Japan Railway Company started operating this station. The CTC center of the Itō Line used to be located at Kinomiya, but along with its renewal to one that includes the controller of tracks at Atami Station in autumn of 2006, it moved to Atami.

Passenger statistics
In fiscal 2013, the station was used by an average of 1133 passengers daily (boarding passengers only).

Surrounding area
 Atami Police Office
Atami Post Office

See also
 List of railway stations in Japan

References

External links

http://www.jreast.co.jp/estation/station/info.aspx?StationCd=600 Official home page] 

Railway stations in Japan opened in 1935
Railway stations in Yamanashi Prefecture
Itō Line
Atami, Shizuoka